Manickpur is a small village in the Vasai (Bassein) township of the Palghar district in the Maharashtra, India.

History 

Not much of the history of Manickpur is documented. It has only been passed down through oral tradition. There are instances of this village in some old manuscripts.

In some old Portuguese manuscripts, the area was known as Puri, although no explanation has been found on why it was called so. One assumption is that earlier there might have been a temple on the lines of the Jagannath Temple in Puri in Orissa, and it was named after it. In Portuguese and English manuscripts it was also referred to as Porim.

The name gradually changed to Manickpuri, but there is no written documentation on it. It is also said that many South Indians settled here due to the proximity of Bombay (as it was earlier known) which was rich in terms of industries, mills, and factories. The name then gradually changed from Porim to Manickpurm.

When the railway was laid by the British, the station that is now known as Vasai Road railway station was then known as Manickpur Road, so it was through the British that the name changed to its present status. The Vasai Road station was known as Bassein road after renaming Manickpur Road. Indian railways still refer to Vasai Road as Bassein road, shown on the station indicators.

Manickpur is situated on a hillock and the base is of stone; therefore, it is believed to have very strong foundations. Due to this, it has withstood many floods and even earthquakes.

Inhabitants 

The main inhabitants of the village of Manickpur can be subdivided into four categories: Kunbi, Khumbar, Vadval, and Agri.

Kunbis were the original inhabitants of this village. Starting from the Parvati Cross to the Chowk, Fadbao, Kharbao, Chinchkombda to Naupada is where they originally built their houses. Almeida, Colaco, D'Mello, Lopes, and Menezes are some of the surnames associated with these people.

Khumbars lived across the Talao or the pond of Manickpur in line with Church Road as the materials for making earthenware were easily found here. D'Souza, Gracias, Pereira, and Alphanso are some of the surnames associated with Khumbars.

Vadvals lived to the south of the church in Barampur. They were engaged in agriculture and related activities. Ghosal, Carval, Vaz, and Cerejo are some of the surnames associated with Vadvals.

Agris lived along the creek and were involved in Salt producing, farming and fishing. Patil, Gharat, Mhatre, Mankar, Bhoir and Kini are some of the surnames associated with this community.

The people of Barampur (the Vadvals) married people in the south of Vasai. Khumbars have their streak from Agashi to Marol. Kunbis found their spouses in the nearby villages of Chulne, Gokhivere, and mostly within Manickpur.

Allied occupations

Even though Manickpur was built on stony land, there was sweet, semi-salty, and salty land around it. Similarly, there were salt pans across it. The number of people of Manickpur actually working in the salt pans was very low, but those engaged in associated activities were high. Transportation of salt and making wooden covers for salt were some of the activities. Sutar-Ali (carpenters), Kumbhar-Ali (potters), and Agris (Salt farming and fishing) were engaged in their traditional activities. The railway added to their source of income.

Teachers, clerks, railway workers, welders, fitters, mechanics, etc. used to frequently travel to Mumbai by train.

History of St. Michael's Church  

The Jesuits lived in the Vasai Fort and had the parishes of Papdy, Sandor and Manickpur in their control. Up to 1605, people from Manickpur used to go to Sandor to celebrate the Eucharistic. But since it was far, the priests established a chapel in Manickpur in 1606. This chapel was made out of wood and had toddy leaves thatched as the roof. Until 1608, priests from Sandor used to come and celebrate Mass and preach. Alexeo Menezes, Archbishop of Goa, then bifurcated the parishes of Manickpur and Sandor.

The land used to build the chapel at Manickpur was donated by a Portuguese lady, Dona Ines Francisca, to the Jesuits in 1572. The Jesuits had to sell off the land for some reason unknown. It finally was bought by another Portuguese lady, Dona Philipa De Fonseca. She finally donated this land back to the Jesuits in her will when she died on 20 June 1625. Rev. Fr. Adrian D'silva started the building of the church, a task taken up by Rev. Fr. Manuel Perez and finally completed by Rev. Fr. Manuel D'costa.

In 1739, Manickpur was raided by the Marathas, who came in through the east, led by Chimnaji Appa. They destroyed all the churches that were on their way to Vasai Fort, and Manickpur was one of them. However, it was later rebuilt in 1851 by Rev. Fr. E.R. Hull (a reference to this can be found in B.M.H Vol. 1.P.5)

That year, the Jesuits fled the village and the diocesan priests took charge of the parish. They were in charge of the parish for almost 200 years, finally handing it over to the Jesuits in 1949. Since then, the Jesuits have run the parish.

See also 
 Agri
 East Indians
 Jesuits

References
 History section of http://www.manickpur.com
 January 2006 issue of Manik - the newsletter of St. Michael's Church, Manickpur
 Various talk sessions with priests and old people from in and around Manickpur
 Catholic Directory of the Archdiocese of Bombay, 1960, 1964 edition, by Msgr. Simon I. Pimenta on the occasion of the 38th International Eucharistic Congress in Bombay, Government Press, Nagpur.
 Catholic Directory of the Archdiocese of Bombay, 1960, 1982 edition, by Frs. Leslie J. Ratus & Fr. Errol Rozario, St. Pius X College, Goregaon, Bombay, 400063.

External links
 Manickpur

Villages in Palghar district